Artena angulata is a species of moth of the family Erebidae first described by Walter Karl Johann Roepke in 1938. It is found on Sumatra and Sulawesi.

References

Catocalinae
Moths of Asia
Moths described in 1938